Lisieux is a commune in the Calvados department in the Normandy region in northwestern France. It is the capital of the Pays d'Auge area, which is characterised by valleys and hedged farmland.

Name
Owing to the large number of similarly named cities, however, it was necessary to specify where this one was located. The local French demonym  derives from the Latin as well.

History

Antiquity
Lisieux was the capital of the Lexovii. In his work, Commentaries on the Gallic War, Caesar mentions a Gallic oppidum, a term which refers to Celtic towns located on the tops of hills. However the Gallo-Roman city was in fact located where Lisieux is to be found today.

Middle Ages
Lisieux was an important center of power in medieval times. The bishopric of Lisieux controlled most of the Pays d'Auge by the 12th century. King Henry II and Eleanor of Aquitaine are thought to have married at Lisieux in 1152, and the town remained powerful for several centuries afterwards, until, in the 14th century, the triple scourges of the Plague, war and resulting famine devastated Lisieux and reduced its influence. The main judge of Joan of Arc, Pierre Cauchon, became a bishop of Lisieux after Joan's death, and is buried in the Lady Chapel of the cathedral.

Events

 4th century: Presence of the Germanic laeti, auxiliaries of the Roman Army, who settled in Lisieux with their families. Their graves have been discovered in the “Michelet” necropolis, some of which contain artefacts typical of northern Germania.
 1432: Pierre Cauchon, the supreme judge during the trial of Joan of Arc at Rouen became the bishop of Lisieux. He commissioned the building of the side chapel of the cathedral, in which he is now buried.
 1590:  During the Eighth War of Religion, Henri IV had to fight to win back his kingdom. When he arrived at Lisieux he took the town without force, after the garrison had fled the town.
 1897:  Sister Thérèse of the Child Jesus of the Holy Face, died in the Carmelite monastery at Lisieux. In 1925, she would be canonized as "St. Thérèse of Lisieux". 
 1907: The first helicopter flight, piloted by Paul Cornu.
 1937: Monseigneur Eugenio Pacelli, papal legate and future Pope Pius XII, visited Lisieux.
 6/7 June 1944: An Allied bombardment killed 800 people and destroyed two thirds of the town.
 23 August 1944: Liberation by the Allied troops.
 1960: Lisieux merged with the Saint-Jacques commune.
 2 June 1980: Pope Jean-Paul II visited Lisieux.

Geography
Lisieux is situated on the confluence of the river Touques and many of its tributaries: the rivers Orbiquet, Cirieux and Graindain.

The town is in the heart of the Pays d'Auge, of which it is the capital. Lisieux is therefore surrounded by Normandy's typical hedged farmland, where there is a mix of livestock farming (mostly milk cows) and cider apple cultivation (from which cider and calvados are made, not forgetting pommeau).

Climate
Lisieux has a temperate oceanic humid climate.

The table below shows the temperatures and precipitation for the year 2007 provided by the Caen-Carpiquet weather station:

The table below shows the record minimum and maximum temperatures:

Transport
The town of Lisieux is served by a bus network called Lexobus, with 6 routes. The town is also linked to surrounding towns and villages by a network of buses; Bus Verts du Calvados.
The main railway station, Lisieux station, which is the connecting station between the Paris-Cherbourg and Paris-Trouville/Deauville main lines, is served by Transport express régional (regional express) trains on the TER Normandie routes. The station appeared in the film Un singe en hiver by Henri Verneuil. There is another station on the line to Deauville: Le Grand-Jardin station.

To reach the town by car, the D613 (formerly route nationale 13) from Paris to Cherbourg crosses the town from east to west. The second main road serving Lisieux is the D579, leading to Deauville to the north and the department of Orne to the south. Lisieux benefits from a bypass, built in the 1990s, running to the south of the town, easing traffic in the town-centre, particularly on boulevard Sainte-Anne.

Religion

Since the Middle Ages Lisieux has been the seat of one of the seven Roman Catholic dioceses of Normandy under the jurisdiction of the ecclesiastical province of Rouen.  The bishopric was abolished in 1801 before being recreated and merged with that of Bayeux in 1855, under the new name of "Bayeux and Lisieux".

The best-known of the Bishops of Lisieux is Pierre Cauchon, who had a decisive influence during the trial of Joan of Arc. He is buried in Lisieux Cathedral.

Devotion to Sainte-Thérèse also known as St. Teresa of the Child Jesus who lived in the nearby Carmelite convent has made Lisieux France's second-most important site of pilgrimage, after the Pyrenean town of Lourdes. Sainte-Thérèse de Lisieux died in 1897, she was canonized in 1925 and named a doctor of the church by Pope John Paul II in 1997.

Administration

Mayors of Lisieux
List of everyone who has held the position of Mayor of Lisieux:

International relations
Lisieux is twinned with:
 Taunton   – since 1951;
 Saint-Georges, Quebec  – since 1996
 Saint-Jérôme, Quebec  [ref. necessary] – since 2010

Population
, Lisieux is Calvados' third largest commune in terms of population, after Caen and Hérouville-Saint-Clair. Its functional urban area of 55,168 inhabitants is the second largest of the department, after Caen. The inhabitants of Lisieux are known as Lexoviens''.

Sights
About 60 percent of the town was destroyed in 1944, so few of the monuments have been preserved.

Basilica of Sainte-Thérèse de Lisieux

The Basilica of Sainte-Thérèse de Lisieux was constructed in honour of Sainte-Thérèse de Lisieux, who was beatified in 1923 and canonized in 1925. It was built for pilgrims who came in increasing numbers to venerate the new saint in the town where she had lived and died.

Carmel of Lisieux
It is possible to visit the chapel and exterior of the Carmel or monastery where Thérèse lived, but the remainder of the building is closed to visitors.

Château de Saint-Germain-de-Livet

As its name indicates, the Château de Saint-Germain-de-Livet is situated in the commune of Saint-Germain-de-Livet.  It is to be found opposite the village church which dates from the 19th century.  The château has been owned by the town of Lisieux since 1958 when it was donated by the Riesener family.

From an architectural point of view the château comprises a half-timbered manor dating from the 15th century and a glazed brick and stone building from the Pré-d'Auge dating from the end of the 16th century.

The chateau combines medieval and Renaissance elements and is surrounded by a moat and a peacock garden.

Lisieux Cathedral

Lisieux Cathedral is a rare monument which survived the 1944 allied bombardment. Even though the cathedral has been around since the 6th century, the church of today must have been constructed between 1160 and 1230 by Bishop Arnoul.

From the outset, the architect designed quadripartite rib vaults and flying buttresses, making it one of Normandy's first Gothic buildings. The nave is fairly austere and is inspired by the Gothic style of the Île de France, whereas the most recent parts of the building were constructed in the 18th century (the chevet, the lantern tower and the western façade) in Norman style.

It is wrongly claimed that Henry Plantagenet, Count of Anjou, Duke of Normandy and future king of England, married Eleanor of Aquitaine at the cathedral in 1152; they married in Poitiers Cathedral. Having been involved in the trial of Joan of Arc, Pierre Cauchon was named as Bishop of Lisieux in 1432 and is buried there.

Town Hall
The town hall (18th century) was formerly a private residence.

Bishop's Garden
French formal garden of the former Bishop's residence, designed by Andre le Notre, recreated in 1837.

Personalities
 Births
 Jean-Baptiste Laumonier (1749–1818), surgeon
 Thomas de Frondeville (1750–1816), politician
 Yves Leopold Germain Gaston (1803–1863), Sugar production pioneer and was known as the "Father of the Sugar Industry" in the Philippines
 Paul-Louis Target (1821–1908), politician
 Henry Chéron (1867–1936), mayor of Lisieux (1894–1908 and 1932–1936) and several times a minister under the French Third Republic
 Raymond Lantier (1886–1980), archaeologist
 Jean Derode (1887–1918), World War I flying ace and military hero
 Jean Charles Contel (1895–1928), painter
 Michel Magne (1930–1984), composer (film music)
 Matthieu Lagrive (1979–), endurance motorbike rider
 Nicolas Batum (1988–), a professional basketball player playing with the Los Angeles Clippers of the National Basketball Association
 Thomas Heurtaux (1988–), footballer
 Chloé Mortaud (1989–), elected Miss France in 2009, lived in Lisieux until she was ten.
 Marine Johannes (1995-), a professional basketball player for the New York Liberty of the WNBA and Lyon Asvel Féminin

 Deaths
 Sainte-Thérèse de Lisieux (1873–1897) Carmelite nun, later canonised as a Saint of the Catholic Church.
 César Ruminski (1924–2009), international footballer.

Photo gallery

See also
 Bishopric of Lisieux
 Communes of the Calvados department
 Georges Vérez, sculptor of Lisieux War Memorial

References

External links

 Lisieux website 
 Tourism website 

 
Communes of Calvados (department)
Subprefectures in France
Lexovii
Gallia Lugdunensis